Aylesbury is a village in the Canadian province of Saskatchewan within the Rural Municipality of Craik No. 222 and Census Division No. 7. The village is approximately 60 km north of the City of Moose Jaw.

History 
Aylesbury incorporated as a village on March 31, 1910. The village was named after Aylesbury Vale, a region in Buckinghamshire, England.

A Parrish & Heimbecker grain elevator was constructed in 1906 and was the last elevator to operate in Aylesbury, up until the mid-1990s. It was demolished in October 2009.

Aylesbury School opened in 1909; in 1970 the school closed and its students were sent to the school in nearby Craik.

In the 1980s, Aylesbury received national media attention when residents rallied in an (ultimately unsuccessful) attempt to convince Canada Post not to close the village's post office. Today, the Canada Post service is contracted to the Aylesbury Hotel.

Aylesbury was the childhood home of Ashley Luther, who modeled and advocated for women's health as Elly Mayday.

As part of a series of monuments in towns along Highway 11, a life-size ox and cart was erected outside Aylesbury in 1999. It was created by Don Wilkins, who also created metal sculptures for the neighbouring towns of Craik and Girvin.

Demographics 

See also 

 List of communities in Saskatchewan
 Villages of Saskatchewan

References 

Villages in Saskatchewan
Craik No. 222, Saskatchewan
Division No. 7, Saskatchewan